WomanSpirit (Fall 1974 - Summer 1984) was a lesbian feminist quarterly founded by Ruth and Jean Mountaingrove and produced collectively near Wolf Creek, Oregon. It was the first American lesbian/feminist periodical to be dedicated to both feminism and spirituality. Many of the contributors to WomanSpirit were, or became, well known within the women's spirituality movement. It had 40 publications, covering topics such as ecology, goddess myths and rituals, feminist theory, and divination. Its submissions included articles, photos, letters, book reviews, artwork, and songs.

History 

WomanSpirit was founded by Ruth and Jean Mountaingrove in 1974, who had a vision for a magazine that was "international and radical feminist. We wanted a cultural revolution—a total reordering of institutions and values. It was to be a modest magazine with grand goals." In 1978, they bought and moved to Rootworks, their lesbian land. From 1979 to 1984, they produced Womanspirit in the barn they built ("Natalie Barney"). Women who came to work on the different issues could stay on the land for however long they needed to or could.

Impact 
At the height of WomanSpirit's circulation, it was distributed to 91 women's bookstores, 10 countries, and had over 3,000 subscribers. The existence of Rootworks and WomanSpirit has been credited by many women for bringing them into rural Oregon to participate in the women's land movement.

After it folded, Jean Mountaingrove suggested that an index be made and Christine Menefee offered to make one. It was published in 1989 and is out of print, but has been useful for researching feminist and women's history.

Notable contributors

See also 
 Goddess movement
 List of lesbian periodicals
 Oregon Women's Land Trust
 Ruth Mountaingrove

References

Further reading 
WomanSpirit archives hosted by Reveal Digital

1974 in LGBT history
1974 establishments in Oregon
1984 disestablishments in Oregon
Defunct magazines published in the United States
Feminism in Oregon
Lesbian culture in Oregon
Lesbian feminist literature
Lesbian history in the United States
Lesbian-related magazines
Lesbian separatism
LGBT literature in the United States
Magazines about spirituality
Magazines disestablished in 1984
Magazines established in 1974
Magazines published in Oregon
Modern pagan magazines
Feminist spirituality